This is a list of flags used in Montenegro. For more information about the national flag, visit the article Flag of Montenegro.

National flags

Standards

Military

Municipal flags

Ethnic groups flags

Historical flags

National flags

Royal flags

Civil ensigns

Military flags

Political flags

See also
 Montenegro
 Flag of Montenegro
 Coat of arms of Montenegro
 Armorial of Montenegro

References

 
Lists and galleries of flags
Flags
National symbols of Montenegro